SGHC may refer to:
 High Court of Singapore
 Sporulenol synthase, an enzyme